Óláfr Guðrøðarson (died 29 June 1153) was a twelfth-century King of Mann and the Isles. As a younger son of Guðrøðr Crovan, King of Dublin and the Isles, Óláfr witnessed a vicious power struggle between his elder brothers in the aftermath of their father's death. At some point, the young Óláfr was entrusted to the care of Henry I, King of England, and like the contemporaneous Scottish monarchs, Alexander I and David I, Óláfr appears to have been a protégé of the English king. As King of the Isles, Óláfr contracted marital alliances with neighbouring maritime rulers. Although he appears to have overseen successful military operations to reclaim the northernmost territories once controlled by his father, he may have witnessed the loss of authority in Galloway as well. Like his counterpart David I, Óláfr was a reformer and moderniser of his realm. However, his four-decade reign ended in abrupt disaster when he was assassinated by three nephews in 1153. Following the ensuing power struggle, Óláfr's son Guðrøðr overcame the kin-slayers, and assumed the kingship of the Kingdom of the Isles.

The Isles—an archipelagic region roughly incorporating the Hebrides and Mann—was ruled by Guðrøðr Crovan for over two decades until his death in 1095, whereupon his eldest son Lǫgmaðr assumed control. Warring soon broke out between factions supporting Lǫgmaðr's younger brother Haraldr, which led to the intervention and encroachment of Irish power into the region. After a short period of Irish domination, the region lapsed into further conflict which was capitalised on by Magnús Óláfsson, King of Norway, who led two military campaigns throughout the Isles and surrounding Irish Sea region at about the turn of the twelfth century. Magnús dominated these regions until his death in 1103, whereupon control of the Isles appears to have fragmented into chaos once again.

Rather than allow ambitious Irish powers fill the power vacuum, Henry I appears to have installed Óláfr on the throne at some point between 1112 and 1115, about the time that Domnall mac Taidc relocated from the Isles to Ireland. Óláfr is recorded to have spent his youth at Henry I's court, and Óláfr's later religious foundations reveal that he was greatly influenced by his English upbringing. In the second quarter of the eleventh century, Óláfr founded Rushen Abbey, a reformed religious house on Mann. He further oversaw the formation of the Diocese of the Isles, the territorial extent of which appears to reveal the boundaries of his realm. Óláfr is recorded to have had at least two wives: Ingibjǫrg, daughter of Hákon Pálsson, Earl of Orkney; and Affraic, daughter of Fergus, Lord of Galloway. The unions seem to reveal that Óláfr shifted from an alliance with Orkney to that with Galloway. Not long after his marriage to Affraic, one of Óláfr's daughters married Somairle mac Gilla Brigte, Lord of Argyll, an emerging power in the region.

Although Óláfr's reign is recorded to have been peaceful, there is reason to suspect that his own succession was uncertain. In 1152, Guðrøðr travelled to Norway and rendered homage to Ingi Haraldsson, King of Norway. At about this time, the Diocese of the Isles was incorporated within the recently elevated Archdiocese of Niðaróss. Whilst this strengthened Norwegian links with the Isles, it secured the ecclesiastical independence of Óláfr's domain, and safeguard his secular authority in the region. Nevertheless, before Guðrøðr returned to the Isles, three sons of Haraldr confronted Óláfr, and demanded a share of the kingdom before slaying him. Although the three men appear to have taken significant steps to counter military intervention from Galloway, they were soon after crushed by Guðrøðr, who returned to the region strengthened by Norwegian military might. Óláfr's descendants went on to reign as kings of the Isles for over a century.

Background

Óláfr was a member of the Crovan dynasty. He was a son of this family's eponymous ancestor, Guðrøðr Crovan, King of Dublin and the Isles. Others sons of Guðrøðr Crovan include Lǫgmaðr and Haraldr. Óláfr's father appears to have secured the kingship of the Isles in the late 1070s, and to have seized the kingship of Dublin in the early 1090s. Guðrøðr Crovan's downfall came in 1094 when he was forced from Ireland altogether by Muirchertach Ua Briain, King of Munster. There is reason to suspect that Guðrøðr Crovan was driven from Mann as well, since he is recorded to have died on Islay the following year.

According to the thirteenth- to fourteenth-century Chronicle of Mann, Guðrøðr Crovan's eldest son, Lǫgmaðr, succeeded to the kingship of the Isles. The chronicle further reveals that Lǫgmaðr faced opposition from within his own family in the form of a rebellion by his brother, Haraldr. Lǫgmaðr eventually overcame Haraldr, however, and is stated to have had him blinded and emasculated. Afterwards, Lǫgmaðr appears to have faced further opposition in the form of a faction supporting his youngest brother, Óláfr. Apparently unable to overthrow Lǫgmaðr on their own, the dissidents turned to Muirchertach, whose recent conquest of Dublin gave him control of that realm's dominating naval forces.

If the chronicle is to be believed, Óláfr's supporters petitioned Muirchertach to provide a regent from his own kin—the Uí Briain—to govern the Isles until Óláfr was old enough to assume control himself. Such a clause may well have been a condition of Muirchertach's involvement, rather than a request. Nevertheless, the chronicle indicates that Muirchertach installed his nephew, Domnall mac Taidc, upon the throne. Although Domnall had previously opposed Muirchertach over the kingship of Munster, he was the son of Muirchertach's brother, and further possessed strong familial connections with the Isles through his maternal descent from Echmarcach mac Ragnaill, King of Dublin and the Isles. Regardless, the death of Domnall's brother, Amlaíb, recorded by the seventeenth-century Annals of the Four Masters in 1096, suggests that Domnall and the rest of the Meic Taidc faced significant opposition in the Isles, possibly in the form of Lǫgmaðr's adherents. Domnall's reign appears to have been brief. The chronicle's account of warfare on the island in about 1097–1098 fails to mention him at all, a fact which seems to be evidence that he had lost control by then.

  
Probably late in 1097, Magnús Óláfsson, King of Norway turned his attention towards the Isles, and sent a certain Ingimundr into the region to take control on his behalf. Unfortunately for Magnús, Ingimundr was soon after slain on Lewis and Harris by leading Islesmen. The following year Magnús took matters into his own hands, and led an invasion-fleet of his into the area. As the invaders successfully carved their way through the Isles towards Mann, Lǫgmaðr was evidently overcome and captured. From Mann, the Norwegians campaigned against the English in Anglesey. Although Magnúss saga berfœtts, within the thirteenth century Heimskringla, places this particular episode in the context of Norwegian conquest, it is likely that Magnús had merely assumed the same protector role that Óláfr's father had once filled with Gruffudd ap Cynan, King of Gwynedd. Magnús gained the submission of Galloway, and may have consolidated his campaign through a treaty with Edgar, King of Scotland.

Magnús overwintered in the Isles, and left for Norway in the summer. He made his return to the region, nearly four years later, in 1102 or 1103. After reestablishing himself on Mann, Magnús entered into a marital alliance with Muirchertach formalised through the marriage between Magnús's young son, Sigurðr, and Muirchertach's young daughter, Bjaðmunjo. The fact that Magnús intended to return to Norway reveals that Muirchertach benefited to most from the arrangement, although the alliance appears to have bound the kings against a common enemy in the region, Domnall Mac Lochlainn, King of Cenél nEógain. Unfortunately for Muirchertach, and his long-term ambitions in the Isles, Magnús was slain in Ulster in 1103, and Sigurðr immediately repudiated his bride and returned to Norway. Although Muirchertach was able to regain control of Dublin and still had held considerable influence in the Isles, Magnús' death left a vacuum which neither Muirchertach nor Domnall Mac Lochlainn could fill.

Restoration of the Crovan dynasty

If the Chronicle of Mann is to be believed, at one point in his career Lǫgmaðr repented the cruelty that he had inflicted upon Haraldr, and remorsefully resigned his kingdom before setting off to Jerusalem where he died. The particular terminology employed by the chronicle—that Lǫgmaðr departed the kingdom "marked with the sign of the Lord's cross"—suggests that he participated in a crusade. On the other hand, since the chronicle was compiled in the thirteenth century, during a period when the idea of a cross-bearing pilgrim was well established, it is possible that this depiction of Lǫgmaðr has been contaminated by anachronistic conceptions.

If Lǫgmaðr was indeed a crusader, it is uncertain which particular crusade he undertook. One possibility is that he took part in the First Crusade, a movement that reached its climax with the successful siege and capture of Jerusalem in mid 1099. Lǫgmaðr could have embarked upon this enterprise in about 1096, the year the pope's calls reached England. Alternately, in light of Lǫgmaðr's capture by the Norwegians in 1098, it is conceivable that his release from custody was made conditional upon his exile and participation in the First Crusade. On the other hand, it is not impossible that Lǫgmaðr originally undertook a pilgrimage before catching wind of the crusade en route.

Another possibility is that Lǫgmaðr regained some form of control in the Isles following Magnús' death, and afterwards joined Sigurðr's expedition to Holy Land in the first decade of the twelfth century. The precise chronology of this enterprise is uncertain, although the Norwegian fleet certainly reached England before the end of the first decade of the twelfth century. It may have been at this point, whilst Sigurðr overwintered at the English royal court, that Lǫgmaðr joined up with him. If Lǫgmaðr and Sigurðr indeed rendezvoused in England, this may have been the time when Óláfr was entrusted to the safekeeping of the English king. Certainly, the chronicle reveals that Óláfr was brought up at the English court. The reason why he was entrusted into the care of the English may have been because Henry I was thought to have been the only monarch who could guarantee Óláfr's safety.

A probable tenth-century ancestor of Óláfr was the Uí Ímair dynast Óláfr kváran, King of Northumbria and Dublin, This man was likely the prototype of the mediaeval literary character variously known as Havelok the Dane. The earliest surviving source detailing Havelok is the twelfth-century Estoire des Engleis. The catalyst for Óláfr kváran's incorporation into twelfth-century English literature may have been Óláfr's stay at the court of Henry I. Conceivably, writers may have sought out the patronage of the young Óláfr by borrowing tales of his famous like-named forebear.

According to the twelfth-century Historia regum Anglorum, Alexander I, King of Scotland struggled to maintain control of his kingdom. One region which may have caused the Scots some concern was the Isles. In 1111, Domnall mac Taidc seized the kingship of the region, possibly with the aid of Muirchertach's northern opponent, Domnall Mac Lochlainn. This encroachment of competing Irish factions into the Isles may well have been as unpalatable to the English and Scots as the power vacuum left in the wake of Magnús' demise.

The exact date of his accession to the kingship of the Isles is uncertain. Although the chronicle claims that he began to reign in 1102, it also states that he reigned for forty years, and shows that he died in 1153. If this reign length is correct, his accession probably dates to about 1112, 1113, 1114, or 1115. In any case, Óláfr's accession dates to about the time of Muirchertach's faltering authority in 1114. Domnall may have been driven out of the Isles by force, or he could have been drawn back to Ireland in an attempt to capitalise upon his uncle's failing health and fleeting authority.

Óláfr's return to the Isles from England appears to have been the work of Henry I, who would have likely welcomed a steadfast dependent in control a region of strategic importance. Although the English and Scottish kings were certainly at odds over Cumbria at about this time, it is likely that they would have cooperated to combat the extension of Uí Briain and Meic Lochlainn influence in the Isles. In fact, the Scottish king's participation in the 1114 English expedition against Gruffudd—a man who seems to have been an associate of Muirchertach—may have been undertaken in this context. Furthermore, Muirchertach was closely associated with the Bellême-Montgomery family that had risen in a failed revolt against the English Crown in the first decade of the century. According to the twelfth-century Gesta regum Anglorum, the English imposed a trade embargo against Muirchertach at some point during the reign of Henry I. Whilst it is possible that this action was a consequence of Muirchertach's familial relationship with his son-in-law Arnulf de Montgomery—and Muirchertach's apparent part in the Bellême-Montgomery insurrection—another possibility is that the sanctions concerned Muirchertach's ambitions in the Irish Sea region, especially since Óláfr had been entrusted into Henry I's care. By establishing Óláfr in the Isles, Henry I may have sought to mitigate the extension of Irish influence in the Isles, and escalate the expansion of English authority into the Irish Sea region.

Alliances

According to the Chronicle of Mann, Óláfr married Affraic, daughter of Fergus, Lord of Galloway. Although the union is not dated by contemporary sources, it appears to have been arranged in the 1130s or 1140s. Affraic is specifically identified as the mother of Guðrøðr by the chronicle. The fact that he is recorded to have travelled to Norway on a diplomatic mission in 1152 suggests that he was an adult by this date, and may indicate that Óláfr and Affraic's union commenced in the 1130s. Several contemporary sources concerning Fergus' descendants suggest that he had married an illegitimate daughter of Henry I in about the 1120s, and that this woman was the mother of at least some of Fergus' offspring, including Affraic herself. In fact, the shared kinship between Guðrøðr and Henry I's succeeding grandson, Henry II, King of England, is noted by the twelfth-century Chronica of Robert de Torigni, Abbot of Mont Saint-Michel. The marital alliance forged between Óláfr and Fergus gave the Crovan dynasty valuable familial-connections with the English king, one of the most powerful rulers in western Europe. Fergus profited from the marriage pact as well, since it bound Galloway more tightly to the Isles, a neighbouring realm from which Galloway had been invaded during the time of Magnús' overlordship. The union also ensured Fergus the protection of one of Britain's most formidable fleets, and gave him a valuable ally then outwith the orbit of the Scottish king.

Óláfr's dealings with Furness Abbey—a religious house founded by the Lord of Lancaster, Stephen of Blois—could be evidence that Óláfr and Stephen enjoyed amiable relations in the first third of the twelfth century, and may indicate that Óláfr supported Stephen as King of England after 1135. At about this time, David I appears to have consolidated his overlordship of Argyll, a region located on the western periphery of the Scottish realm. By about 1140, not only had Óláfr and Fergus bound themselves together, but Somairle mac Gilla Brigte, Lord of Argyll married one of Óláfr's illegitimate daughters. Although the name of this woman is not recorded by the Chronicle of Mann, she is identified as Ragnhildr by the thirteenth-century Orkneyinga saga. The marital binding of Óláfr with two of David I's dependants—Fergus and Somairle—roughly coincided with the Scottish king's endeavour to establish control of Cumbria in the 1130s and 1140s. During this period, David's authority extended southwards along the Cumbrian coast through Copeland, Furness, into Stephen's former honour of Lancaster, thereby making him a principal power in the northern Irish Sea region. The martial alliances concerning Óláfr, therefore, may have formed part of a Scottish strategy to not only isolate him from an English alliance, but to project Scottish authority into the Irish Sea, and draw Óláfr into David I's sphere of influence.

Besides his wife Affraic, the chronicle states that Óláfr had many concubines by whom he had several daughters—including the daughter married to Somairle—and three sons: Rǫgnvaldr, Lǫgmaðr, and Haraldr. The B-text of the thirteenth-century Fagrskinna records that Óláfr married Ingibjǫrg, daughter of Hákon Pálsson, Earl of Orkney. Whilst Ingibjǫrg is not referred to by the chronicle, she is certainly linked to Óláfr by Orkneyinga saga, although this source also incorrectly states—in a passage concerning Guðrøðr's son and successor, Rǫgnvaldr—that Ingibjǫrg was Guðrøðr's mother. As a consequence of this error, there is reason to suspect that the saga has conflated Guðrøðr's son with Somairle's like-named son, Ragnall. The saga's confused entry, therefore, may be evidence that Ingibjǫrg was the mother of Óláfr's daughter, Ragnhildr. The terminology employed by the sources documenting Affraic and Ingibjǫrg reveal that the latter's relationship with Óláfr came to be viewed differently in Orkney than the Isles. Although Orkneyinga saga acknowledges that the union between Ingibjǫrg's own parents was not a canonical marriage either, the coupling formed the basis for her family's claim to the earldom. Whatever the case, Óláfr's union with Ingibjǫrg likely predates his marriage to Affraic. Accordingly, Óláfr appears to have turned from an alliance with Ingibjǫrg's brother and Norwegian dependant, Páll Hákonarson, Earl of Orkney, to establish an alliance with Fergus, who was then a rising power in the Irish Sea region. The result of this shift may be alluded to by the chronicle which states that Óláfr held peaceful alliances with Irish and Scottish kings so that none "dared disturbed" the Kingdom of the Isles.

Ecclesiastical foundations and appointments

Whilst at the English royal court, Óláfr could well have met members of the Scottish monarchy. For example, Henry I's wife was Matilda, whose royal brothers, Alexander I and the future David I, King of Scotland, both resided in England before the onset of their reigns (the brothers respectively reigned in 1102–1124 and 1124–1153). Óláfr would have certainly been exposed to Henry I's efforts to reform the English Church. Both Matilda and her husband were renowned patrons of religious orders, the Augustinians in particular. Although Óláfr's stay at Henry's court predated the arrival of the Savignac and Cistercian orders in England, Óláfr's experiences in England clearly influenced his decision to introduce reformed monastic orders into his own realm. In fact, the ecclesiastical actions of Óláfr's Scottish contemporaries—David I, and his predecessing Alexander I—were similarly influenced by their time spent in England. Óláfr's interest in religious reform is alluded to by the Chronicle of Mann, which declares: "he was devout and enthusiastic in matters of religion and was welcome both to God and men".

The ecclesiastical jurisdiction within Óláfr's kingdom was the Diocese of the Isles. Little is known of its early history, although its origins may well lie with the Uí Ímair imperium. Ecclesiastical interconnection between the Isles and Dublin seems to have been severed during a period of Irish overlordship of Dublin, at about the beginning of Guðrøðr Crovan's reign in the Isles. By the time of Óláfr's reign, the diocese appears to have encompassed the islands that had formerly been claimed by Magnús, and may well have included territory in western Galloway. In a letter that appears to date to about 1113, at about start of his reign, Óláfr presented an unnamed bishop for consecration to an Archbishop of York. Although the letter identifies the bishop with the initial "G", which potentially could represent Gerald, whose tenure dates to 1100–1108, the fact that Óláfr's reign appears to have commenced several years later suggests that the initial is erroneous, and that the initial "T" was intended, perhaps in reference to either archbishop Thomas, or the Thomas' successor, Thurstan. No consecration is recorded in English sources, and Óláfr's candidate is not recorded in the chronicle.

In about 1134, the chronicle reveals that Óláfr founded the Rushen Abbey on Mann by granting Ivo, Abbot of Furness land to establish the house. As a Savignac daughter house of nearby Furness Abbey—a religious house seated just across the Irish Sea in Lancashire—Rushen Abbey was the first reformed house in the Isles, and its foundation partly evidences the importance of links between Mann and northern England. During his tenure as archbishop (1114–1140), Thurstan was a proponent of ecclesiastical reform in northern England, and there is reason to suspect that he played an active role in Óláfr's foundation. Not only did it continue Thurstan's programme of monastic reform, but it further extended the ecclesiastical authority of the Archdiocese of York. In any case, the abbey's foundation charter reveals that Óláfr granted the monks of Furness the right to elect the Bishop of the Isles, a provision that not only emphasised Óláfr's royal prerogative, but allowed Furness to funnel continental influences into the Isles. The charter implies that episcopal authority within his realm had fallen to outsiders, and expresses the king's desire that the Isles be administered by its own bishop. This could be evidence that the former diocesan bishop, Hamond, died several years previous, and that a period of vacancy ensued in which neighbouring bishops took up the slack. The reestablishment of the Diocese of Whithorn in 1128, may have been undertaken in this context, and may also signal the loss of western Galloway from the Kingdom of the Isles.

In a letter that probably dates not long after his foundation, Óláfr wrote to Thurstan, and confirmed the candidate elected by the monks of Furness. Hamond's successor appears to have been the shadowy Wimund, Bishop of the Isles. According to the twelfth-century Historia rerum Anglicarum, Wimund began his ecclesiastical career at Furness before removing to Rushen. Although a twelfth-century chronicle of the ecclesiastical history of York states that Wimund professed obedience to Thomas, this archbishop's early tenure (1109–1114) suggests he has been confused with Thurstan. As a monk of Furness, Wimund may have originally relocated to Mann in the context of Óláfr's foundation of Rushen. He appears to have been the first Bishop of the Isles elected by the monks of Furness, and seems to have been consecrated by Thurstan. Wimund appears to have used his elevated position to violently seek the inheritance of an Earl of Moray in the late 1140s. Wimund's warring against the Scots eventually forced David I to cede him lands near Furness before his capture and mutilation in 1152. It is likely that Wimund's campaigning led to the abandonment of his diocesan see, and that his actions posed a serious threat to Óláfr's authority.

The fact that Wimund is not listed amongst other diocesan bishops by the Chronicle of Mann could be evidence that Óláfr eventually came to repudiate him. A letter from Óláfr to the chapter of York suggests that the king unsuccessfully attempted to have a replacement, a certain Nicholas, consecrated by Robert de Ghent, Dean of York. The fact that Óláfr interacted with the dean suggests that the correspondence dates between the 1147 deposition of William fitz Herbert, Archbishop of York and the 1152 consecration of Henry Murdac, Archbishop of York. Óláfr's inability to have his man consecrated may have been due to the Wimund episode being unresolved at the time. According to Robert de Torigni's Chronica and the thirteenth-century Wendover version Flores historiarum, Henry Murdac consecrated John, a Benedictine monk from Normandy, as Bishop of the Isles in 1152. The fact that the Chronicle of Mann fails to record John's name amongst other diocesan bishops appears to indicate that he was an unacceptable candidate to Óláfr and the Islesmen, and that John never occupied his see.

Ecclesiastical and secular independence

By way of his ecclesiastical actions, Óláfr firmly established the Diocese of the Isles to correspond to the territorial borders of his kingdom, and seems to have initiated the transfer the ecclesiastical obedience of the Isles from the Archdiocese of Canterbury to the Archdiocese of York. Such changes may have been orchestrated as a means to further distance his diocese from that of Dublin, where diocesan bishops were consecrated by the Archbishop of Canterbury. In 1152, steps were undertaken by the papacy to elevate the Diocese of Dublin to an archdiocese. Dublin's political and economic ties with the Isles could have meant that the Bishop of the Isles was now in danger of becoming subordinate to the Archbishop of Dublin. For Óláfr, such an event would have threatened to undermine both his ecclesiastical authority and secular power within his own realm. As a result of Óláfr's inability to have Nicholas formally consecrated, and his refusal to accept John as bishop, the episcopal see of the Isles appears to have been vacant at the same time of Dublin's ecclesiastical ascendancy. In consequence, without a consecrated bishop of its own, Óláfr's diocese seems to have been in jeopardy of falling under Dublin's increasing authority. Moreover, in 1152, David I attempted to have the dioceses of Orkney and the Isles included within the prospective Scottish Archdiocese of St Andrews.

It may have been in the context of this ecclesiastical crisis in the Isles that Guðrøðr undertook his journey to Norway in 1152. Guðrøðr's overseas objective, therefore, may have been to secure the patronage of a Scandinavian metropolitan willing to protect the Diocese of the Isles. Certainly, Guðrøðr's stay in Norway coincided with the Scandinavian visit of the papal legate Nicholas Breakspeare, Cardinal-Bishop of Albano, a man who had been tasked to create Norwegian and Swedish ecclesiastical provinces in order to further extend the papacy's authority into the northern European periphery. Eventually the newly created Norwegian province—the Archdiocese of Niðaróss—encompassed eleven dioceses within and outwith mainland Norway. One such overseas diocese was that of the Isles, officially incorporated within the province in November 1154. Although Óláfr did not live long enough to witness the latter formality, it is evident that the remarkable overseas statecraft undertaken by Óláfr and Guðrøðr secured their kingdom's ecclesiastical and secular independence from nearby Dublin. The establishment of the Norwegian archdiocese bound outlying Norse territories closer to Norwegian royal power. In effect, the political reality of the Diocese of the Isles—its territorial borders and nominal subjection to far-off Norway—appears to have mirrored that of the Kingdom of the Isles.

Kingship

In some respects, Óláfr's kingship may be comparable to that of David I, a significant moderniser of the Scottish realm. Due to his time spent in England, Óláfr seems to have introduced modern forms of feudalism into his realm, and to have developed manorialism on Mann. Óláfr seems to have introduced the parochial system into the Isles; and like David I, Óláfr transformed the church within his realm, creating a territorially defined diocese. His establishment of a more modern territorial kingship, which came to be associated with its demesne on Mann, may have led to the alienation of outlying areas. Although climatic conditions in the Isles improved in the eleventh century, and agricultural production appears to have increased as a result, there appears to have been a decrease in manufacturing by the twelfth century. Evidence of an eleventh-century mint on Mann exists prior to Guðrøðr Crovan's rule, but there is no evidence of one during Óláfr's reign, and no coins bearing the names of any of the members of his dynasty have been found.

The acclamation or election of a king was an important component of kingship in northern mediaeval Europe. There are several examples of the role played by chieftains in the kingship of the Isles during Óláfr's floruit. For instance, the leading men of the realm are recorded to have brokered the deal to have Muirchertach provide a regent until Óláfr was old enough to reign, whilst disaffected chieftains are reported to have brought about the dramatic end of Ingimundr's regency, and chieftains are said to have accompanied Óláfr from England to begin his reign. Even in the immediate aftermath of Óláfr's demise, the Chronicle of Mann reveals that the chieftains of the Isles gathered together and unanimously elected Guðrøðr as king.

There is surviving evidence of only twenty royal charters dating from the reign of the Crovan dynasty. Of these, only one dates to the reign of Óláfr. Óláfr styled himself , a Latin equivalent of a Gaelic title first accorded to his 10th century predecessor, Guðrøðr Haraldsson, King of the Isles. Surviving sources indicate that Óláfr was the first of several kings from his dynasty to claim to rule  ("by the grace of God"). The use of this formula was common amongst contemporary European monarchs but its use by the kings of the Isles, like the kings of Scotland, appears to have been adopted in imitation of the charters issued by the Angevin kings of England. Like the Scots, Óláfr and his successors appear to have adopted the formula to emphasise their sovereign right to kingship, to take their place amongst the leading monarchs of their time. Óláfr's use of the formula exemplifies the fact that—in comparison to his royal predecessors in the Isles—he was a new kind of ruler and the real founder of later Manx kingship. The fact that Óláfr was brought up at the English royal court could suggest that he, like David I, was knighted by the English king. Certainly, several of Óláfr's thirteenth-century royal successors were knighted by their English counterpart.

Óláfr appears to have been an energetic king who consolidated his rule in the northern portion of the Isles by way of military force. There is reason to suspect that this region had fallen under Orcadian influence before being reclaimed by the Islesmen under Óláfr. According to Hebridean tradition preserved by the seventeenth-century Sleat History, he was aided by Somairle in military operations (otherwise unrecorded in contemporary sources) against the "ancient Danes north of Ardnamurchan". Together with its claim that Óláfr also campaigned on North Uist, this source may be evidence that the bitter struggle between Guðrøðr and Somairle (fought after Óláfr's demise) took place in the context of Somairle taking back territories that he had originally helped secure into Óláfr's kingdom. Somairle first emerges into the historical record in the 1130s supporting an unsuccessful rival branch of the Scottish royal family against David I. By about the time of Somairle's marriage to Óláfr's daughter, David I seems to have successfully imposed his authority over Argyll. As a result of this apparent overlordship, Somairle may have been encouraged to redirect his energies from Scotland into the Isles.

There is reason to suspect that the Kingdom of the Isles lost control of territories in Galloway during Óláfr's floruit. Earlier in the mid eleventh century, the Rhinns of Galloway may have been ruled by Guðrøðr Crovan's predecessor, Echmarcach. By the last years of the century, the region was ruled by Mac Congail, King of the Rhinns, who may have been a descendant of Guðrøðr Crovan's immediate predecessor, Fingal mac Gofraid. Whether Mac Congail ruled independently or subordinate to Guðrøðr Crovan is unknown. The installation of Gilla Aldan as Bishop of Whithorn, in the third decade of the twelfth century, may mark the date when the Rhinns finally separated from the Kingdom of the Isles. Although support from the rulers of Galloway and Scotland may well have strengthened Óláfr's position in the Isles, and the chronicle portrays his reign as one of peacefulness, other sources vaguely recount the mainland depredations wrought by Wimund. The latter's warring against the Scots suggests that Óláfr may have struggled to maintain control of his far-flung kingdom.

It is uncertain how the Diocese of the Isles was organised during Óláfr's reign. There may well have been several regional centres where diocesan bishops, accompanied by retinues of clerics and warriors, would have visited each successive region, living off the rendered tithes. In time however, the ecclesiastical endowments on Mann, commenced by Óláfr and further developed by his successors, would have reduced the need for such peripatetic diocesan bishops. As the kings of the Isles became more identified with their seat on Mann, so too were the bishops of the Isles, which may have resulted in the alienation of outlying areas.

The now-ruinous ecclesiastical site of Cille Donnain, near Loch Kildonan on South Uist, could well have been a bishop's seat and twelfth-century power-centre in the Isles. Its precise place in the organisation of the Isles is uncertain. Certainly, Lǫgmaðr is associated with the Uists by a particular verse of poetry, attributed to the contemporary skald Gísl Illugason, preserved by the early thirteenth-century Morkinskinna. This contemporary composition could be evidence of a connection between him, or an associated bishop, with the Uist chain of islands. It is possible that, at a later date, the Cille Donnain site could have formed a residence for the peripatetic diocesan bishops of the Isles during their periodic visitations in the Uists.

Death

The year 1153 was a watershed in the history of the Kingdom of the Isles. Not only did David I die late in May, but Óláfr himself was assassinated about a month later on 29 June, whilst Guðrøðr was still absent in Norway. According to the Chronicle of Mann, Óláfr had been confronted by three Dublin-based nephews—the Haraldssonar—the sons of his exiled brother, Haraldr. After hearing the demands of these men—that half of the kingdom should be handed over to them—a formal council was convened in which one of the Haraldssonar—a man named Rǫgnvaldr—approached Óláfr, raised his axe as if to salute the king, and decapitated him in a single stroke. In the resulting aftermath, the chronicle relates that the Haraldssonar partitioned the island amongst themselves. Whether the men attained any form of authority in the rest of the Isles is unknown. Once in control of Mann, the chronicle reveals that the men fortified themselves against forces loyal to Guðrøðr, the kingdom's legitimate heir, by launching a preemptive strike against his maternal grandfather, Fergus. Although the invasion of Galloway was repulsed with heavy casualties, once the Haraldssonar returned to Mann the chronicle records that they slaughtered and expelled all resident Gallovidians that they could find. This ruthless reaction evidently reveals an attempt to uproot local factions adhering to Guðrøðr and his mother.

Within months of his father's assassination, Guðrøðr executed his vengeance. According to the chronicle, he journeyed from Norway to Orkney, enstrengthened by Norwegian military support, and was unanimously acclaimed as king by the leading Islesmen. He is then stated to have continued on to Mann where he overcame his three kin-slaying cousins, putting one to death whilst blinding the other two, and successfully secured the kingship for himself. Guðrøðr's reliance upon Norwegian assistance, instead of support from his maternal-grandfather, could suggest that the attack upon Galloway was more successful than the compiler of the chronicle cared to admit. Additionally, the account of incessant inter-dynastic strife amongst the ruling family of Galloway, recorded in the twelfth-century Vita Ailredi, suggests that Fergus may have struggled to maintain control of his lordship by the mid 1150s, and may also explain his failure to come to Guðrøðr's aid following Óláfr's death.

The fact that Óláfr sent Guðrøðr to Norway in 1152 could suggest there had been anxiety over the succession of the Kingdom of the Isles, and that Guðrøðr rendered homage to Ingi Haraldsson, King of Norway in an effort secure assistance in safeguarding the kingship. The chronicle's account of Guðrøðr's return from Norway notes that he arrived with a fleet of five ships, which could indicate that overseas support was indeed obtained. The earlier episode of conflict between Óláfr's elder brothers, his own slaying at the hands of his nephews, and the later internecine struggles endured by his descendants, reveal that competition for the kingship of the Isles was incredibly competitive and exceptionally violent. The turn to Ingi occurred at about the same time that Norwegian encroachment superseded roughly thirty years of Scottish influence in Orkney and Caithness, and could be evidence of a perceived wane in Scottish royal authority in the first years of the 1150s. In November 1153, following the death of David I, Somairle seized the initiative and rose in revolt against the recently inaugurated Malcolm IV, King of Scotland. The dynastic challenges faced by Malcolm, and the ebb of Scottish influence in the Isles, may partly account for Guðrøðr's success in consolidating control of the kingdom, and may be perceptible in the seemingly more aggressive policy he pursued as king in comparison to his father.

Through Guðrøðr, Óláfr was the patrilineal-ancestor of later rulers of the Crovan dynasty, a kindred whose tenure of power in the Isles lasted until the second half of the thirteenth century. Through Ragnhildr, Óláfr was an important ancestor of the rulers of Clann Somairle, the descendants of Ragnhildr's husband Somairle. Whilst the union certainly testifies to Somairle's esteemed status, the key to his successful career may well have been the marriage itself. In fact, the early rulers of Clann Somairle appear to have owed their claim to the kingship of the Isles by right of their genealogical link to Óláfr through Ragnhildr.

Although the burial place of Óláfr is unrecorded and unknown, by the second quarter of the thirteenth century Rushen Abbey appears to have filled the role of royal mausoleum for the Crovan dynasty. Guðrøðr was himself buried on Iona, an island upon which the oldest intact building is St Oran's Chapel. Certain Irish influences in this building's architecture indicate that it dates to about the mid twelfth century. The chapel could well have been erected by Óláfr or Guðrøðr. Certainly, their family's remarkable ecclesiastical activities during this period suggest that patronage of Iona is probable.

Notes

Citations

References

Primary sources

Secondary sources

External links

1153 deaths
11th-century Manx people
11th-century Scottish people
12th-century Manx people
12th-century Scottish people
12th-century rulers of the Kingdom of the Isles
12th-century murdered monarchs
Assassinated royalty
Crovan dynasty
Monarchs of the Isle of Man
Year of birth unknown